Nebojša Bakočević (born 15 February 1965) is a Serbian actor.  He was first cast as a child actor in the 1970s and gained prominence in 1980s in films including Dancing in Water and The Fall of Rock and Roll.  Bakočević has largely been inactive since 1999, most recently appearing in the 2008 TV series Vratiće se rode (The Storks Will Return).

References

External links

1965 births
Living people
Male actors from Belgrade
Serbian male film actors
20th-century Serbian male actors
21st-century Serbian male actors
Serbian male child actors
Serbian male television actors